HMS Snapper was a  which served with the Royal Navy.  She was launched in 1895, and served in home waters.

She served as part of the Medway Instructional Flotilla in 1901. Lieutenant John Foster Grant-Dalton was appointed in command on 14 February 1902. She docked for repairs to her stem in late May 1902, but was back in the North Sea by early June, and took part in the fleet review held at Spithead on 16 August 1902 for the coronation of King Edward VII. Lieutenant Charles Montagu Foot was appointed in command on 17 October 1902.

She was sold off in 1911.

Notes

Bibliography

 

Salmon-class destroyers
Ships built on the Humber
1895 ships
A-class destroyers (1913)